Miroslav Lažo (born October 18, 1977) is a Slovak professional ice hockey player (right wing) currently playing in Malmö Redhawks of the HockeyAllsvenskan. He has played with the HC Slovan Bratislava in the Slovak Extraliga.

Career statistics

References

External links 

Living people
HC Slovan Bratislava players
MsHK Žilina players
HC Košice players
HC '05 Banská Bystrica players
Rytíři Kladno players
Avtomobilist Yekaterinburg players
Sputnik Nizhny Tagil players
Quad City Mallards (UHL) players
HK Trnava players
HC Berounští Medvědi players
HC Neftekhimik Nizhnekamsk players
Malmö Redhawks players
HK 36 Skalica players
HK Dukla Michalovce players
Slovak ice hockey right wingers
1977 births
Ice hockey people from Bratislava
Slovak expatriate ice hockey players in Germany
Slovak expatriate ice hockey players in Russia
Slovak expatriate ice hockey players in Sweden
Slovak expatriate ice hockey players in the Czech Republic